Ctrl is an American comedy web series by NBC. It is the first stand-alone web series launched by a major television network. The series stars Tony Hale as a typical office-working, self-confidence-lacking nerd who discovers he can undo things (as well as employ other keyboard functions) in real life. It is an adaptation and expansion of the short film Ctrl Z by Robert Kirbyson, which was a winner at the 2008 Sundance Film Festival.

CTRL was spotted and developed by SXM from the original short film Ctrl Z, which was screened at the Sundance Film Festival in 2008. SXM ultimately partnered with NBC's digital studio to produce the online series. After NBC shut the digital studio in 2011, all rights reverted to SXM, who are currently developing Season 2 with Yahoo and a private investor. By 2012, the episodes were no longer on the NBC website, and by 2022 no longer on Hulu.

Cast
Tony Hale as Stuart Grundy
Steve Howey as Ben Piller
Emy Coligado as Elizabeth
Edgar Morais as Jeremy
Richard Karn as Arthur Piller
 Scott L. Schwartz as a security guard

Episodes

Games
There are also two games on the NBC website.  The first lets you guess Stuart's password ("MERLIN'S IVORY BEARD") and watch some extra video clips.  The second lets you explore Stuart's desktop.  You can use Stuart's password from the first game to watch more of the second.  By manipulating the flash file by going "back" in the flash file, you can get the option to type in a Username and Password with a submit button below.

References

External links
Ctrl on NBC's Official Website (as of 2012-04-02, the actual link works but no videos are present)
Ctrl on Hulu

American comedy web series
American science fiction web series
2009 web series debuts
2009 web series endings
American time travel television series
NBC original programming
Television shows set in Los Angeles
Television series by Universal Television